Sora was a town of ancient Anatolia in the borderlands between ancient Bithynia and Paphlagonia, inhabited in Byzantine times.

Its site is located near Zora, Asiatic Turkey.

References

Populated places in Bithynia
Populated places in ancient Paphlagonia
Former populated places in Turkey
Populated places of the Byzantine Empire
History of Çankırı Province